Jean-Paul Matte (November 18, 1914 – January 6, 1992) was a Canadian politician and a Member of the House of Commons.

Background

He was born on November 18, 1914 in Saint-Tite, Mauricie and was a merchant and farmer.

Political career

Matte ran as a Liberal candidate in the federal district of Champlain in 1962 and won.  He was re-elected in 1963 and 1965.

However, he was defeated by Ralliement Créditiste candidate René Matte in 1968.

Death

He died on January 6, 1992.

References

1914 births
1992 deaths
Liberal Party of Canada MPs
Members of the House of Commons of Canada from Quebec